Game Night may refer to:

GameNight, radio show
Game Night (film), a 2018 American dark comedy film starring Jason Bateman and Rachel McAdams
"Game Night" (Brooklyn Nine-Nine)
"Game Night" (How I Met Your Mother)
Game Night (web series)

See also 
 Family Game Night (disambiguation)